The Phantom Shot is a 1947 British mystery film directed by Mario Zampi and starring John Stuart, Olga Lindo and Howard Marion-Crawford. It marked Zampi's return to filmmaking after he had been interned during the Second World War.

Cast
 John Stuart as Inspector Webb 
 Olga Lindo as Mrs. Robson  
 Howard Marion-Crawford as Sgt. Clapper  
 Louise Lord as Anne Horder  
 Ronald Adam as Caleb Horder  
 John Varley as Peter Robson  
 Cyril Conway as Philip Grahame  
 Jock McKay as Angus  
 Leslie Armstrong

References

Bibliography
 Chibnall, Steve & McFarlane, Brian. The British 'B' Film. Palgrave MacMillan, 2009.

External links

1947 films
British mystery films
1947 mystery films
Films set in England
Films directed by Mario Zampi
British black-and-white films
1940s English-language films
1940s British films